The Uttarakhand Legislative Assembly, also known as the Uttarakhand Vidhan Sabha, is a unicameral governing and law making body of Uttarakhand, one of the 28 states of India. It is seated at Dehradun, the winter capital, and Bhararisain, the summer capital of Uttarakhand. The total strength of the assembly is 70 Members of the Legislative Assembly (MLA).

As of March 2022, Pushkar Singh Dhami is the current Chief Minister of Uttarakhand and Leader of the House in the 5th Vidhan Sabha. The Speaker of the Assembly is Ritu Khanduri Bhushan. Gurmit Singh is the current Governor of Uttarakhand.

History

5th Uttarakhand Assembly

See also 
 Government of Uttarakhand
 Governor of Uttarakhand
 Chief Minister of Uttarakhand
 Speaker of the Uttarakhand Legislative Assembly
 Leader of the Opposition in the Uttarakhand Legislative Assembly
 Cabinet of Uttarakhand
 List of constituencies of the Uttarakhand Legislative Assembly
 List of former constituencies of the Uttarakhand Legislative Assembly
 List of by-elections to the Uttarakhand Legislative Assembly
 Lok Sabha
 Rajya Sabha
 State Legislature
 State Legislative Assemblies
 State Legislative Councils

Notes
  In the 2012 Assembly election, Uttarakhand Kranti Dal contested as "Uttarakhand Kranti Dal (P)" led by then party president Trivendra Singh Panwar. The original party name and the election symbol (chair) was frozen by the Election Commission of India following the factionism and leadership dispute within the party that led to its break-up. Its original name and party symbol were restored in 2017.

References

External links
 Uttarakhand Lok Sabha Election 2019 Result Website
 Elected Members of Legislative Assembly of Uttarakhand, Official list Govt. of Uttarakhand.
 Members of Uttarakhand Legislative Assembly
 Uttarakhand Legislative Assembly
 President’s rule in Uttarakhand; Congress says ‘murder of democracy’

 
Politics of Uttarakhand
State legislatures of India
Government of Uttarakhand
Unicameral legislatures
2002 establishments in Uttarakhand